Fonfría may refer to:

Fonfría, a municipality in the province of Teruel, Spain.
Fonfría, a municipality in the province of Zamora, Spain.
Fonfría de Fonsagrada, a parish in A Fonsagrada, Galicia, Spain.